Oktay Yusein (born 25 July 2000) is a Bulgarian footballer who plays as a winger or forward for Krumovgrad.

Career
Yusein joined Lokomotiv Plovdiv at the age of 13 and progressed through the Lokomotiv academy to become a regular member of the U19 squad.

Career statistics

Club

Honours

Club
Lokomotiv Plovdiv
 Bulgarian Cup: 2018–19

References

External links

2000 births
Living people
Bulgarian footballers
PFC Lokomotiv Plovdiv players
FC Strumska Slava Radomir players
PFC Rilski Sportist Samokov players
Neftochimic Burgas players
FC Krumovgrad players
First Professional Football League (Bulgaria) players
Bulgarian people of Turkish descent
Association football midfielders